Solagna is a town in the province of Vicenza, Veneto, north-eastern Italy. It is east of SS47 state road. Sights include the church of Santa Giustina, with artworks by Brustolon and Giuseppe Ghedina; it also houses the alleged tomb of Ezzelino II da Romano.

Twin towns
Solagna is twinned with:

  Codogno, Italy

References

External links
View at Google Maps

Cities and towns in Veneto